Camelot Ghana is a Ghanaian printing company, serving the West Africa market.  The company was founded in 1963.  The company's principal business includes the printing of stationery, computer stationery, security stationery, and business printing including stock certificates, cheques, chequebooks, payment vouchers, invoices and dividend warrants.

Camelot's stock is listed on the Ghana Stock Exchange and is a component of the GSE All-Share Index.

External links
Camelot Ghana official homepage
Camelot Ghana at Alacrastore
Camelot Ghana research page from Gold Coast Securities, in PDF format

Printing companies
Manufacturing companies based in Accra
Manufacturing companies established in 1963
1963 establishments in Ghana
Companies listed on the Ghana Stock Exchange